Damião is the Portuguese version of the general European name Damian, from the Latin Damianus and, in turn, from the Greek Δαμιανος Damianos which was derived from the Greek word δαμαω damao meaning "to tame". Generally a given name, it can also be a family surname.

It may refer to:
Cosme Damião, Portuguese footballer
Damião António Franklin, Angolan Catholic bishop
Damião de Góis, Portuguese humanist philosopher (1502–1574)
Damião Vaz d'Almeida, São Tomé and Príncipe politician
Leandro Damião, Brazilian footballer
Liberato Damião Ribeiro Pinto, Portuguese military officer and Prime Minister (1880–1949)
Mário Hipólito Damião, Angolan footballer
Pedro Damião, Portuguese chess master (1480–1544)
Wellington Damião Nogueira Marinho, Brazilian footballer
Damião Experiença, Brazilian musician

Other
Damião, municipality in Paraíba, Brazil
São Cosme e São Damião, parish in Arcos de Valdevez, Portugal

Portuguese-language surnames
Portuguese masculine given names